Legislative elections were held in France on 25 September and 4 October 1816 to elect the first legislature of the Second Restoration.

Only citizens paying taxes were eligible to vote.

All electors elected three-fifths of all deputies in the first round. In the second round, the most heavily taxed voted again to elect the remaining two-fifths of deputies.

Results

References

Legislative elections in France
France
France
France